Radio Venceremos (Spanish; in English, "'We Shall Overcome' Radio") was an 'underground' radio network of the anti-government Farabundo Martí National Liberation Front (FMLN) during the Salvadoran Civil War. The station "specialized in ideological propaganda, acerbic commentary, and pointed ridicule of the government". The radio station was founded by Carlos Henríquez Consalvi (Santiago).

Despite the end of the war in 1992, the network continues to broadcast. The war years of the station and its national and international influence were documented in the Spanish-language book Las mil y una historias de radio Venceremos and its English translation, Rebel radio: the story of El Salvador's Radio Venceremos, by the author José Ignacio López Vigil (translator: Mark Fried), a book recorded by the American Library of Congress. An exhibit honoring Radio Venceremos, including a studio room with original equipment, forms a prominent part of the Museum of the Revolution in Perquín, Morazán, El Salvador.

Digitized recordings of the Radio Venceremos broadcasts are freely available online through the Human Rights Documentation Initiative at the LLILAS Benson Latin American Studies and Collections at the University of Texas at Austin.

Further reading 
López Vigil, José Ignacio. Rebel radio: the story of El Salvador's Radio Venceremos. (Translator, Mark Fried). Willimantic, CT: Curbstone Press, [1994]. Translation of Las mil y una historias de Radio Venceremos. .
Consalvi, Carlos Henríquez (Santiago). La Terquedad del Izote, La historia de Radio Venceremos. México: Editorial Diana, Ediciones Museo de la Palabra y la Imagen, 1992. 268p., 
 Radio Venceremos Digital Collection - University of Texas Libraries

References 

Salvadoran Civil War
Radio in El Salvador
Defunct mass media in El Salvador
Radio stations established in 1981
Radio stations disestablished in 1994